Isaeidae is a family of amphipods. It is the only family classified under the superfamily Isaeoidea. It contains the following genera:
Cerapopsis Della Valle, 1893
Cheirophotis Walker, 1904
Eurystheus 
Isaea Milne-Edwards, 1830

Noenia 
Podoceropsis Boeck, 1861

References

Corophiidea